The Citroën TUB (from the French Traction Utilitaire Basse or Traction Utilitaire type B) was a light van derived from the Traction Avant passenger car.  The van was produced by Citroën between 1939 and 1941. In May 1941 an upgraded version, the Citroën TUC replaced the TUB, but by the end of that year the last of these vans had probably been produced.

The TUB is the first commercial vehicle ever equipped with a lateral sliding door.

Origins
Pierre Michelin and Pierre-Jules Boulanger were brought in to take charge of Citroën by Michelin following their acquisition of the bankrupt auto-maker in December 1934. During the Summer of 1936 Boulanger received the results of an extensive investigation of customer requirements that he had commissioned. The exercise had been undertaken in preparation for the development of a van of approximately  capacity - slightly more than the load that could be accommodated by a simple car-based van. Boulanger accumulated a large dossier of photographs, statistics, sketches and comments. From this he laid down a specification which was simple and demanding. To maximise available load space, the new van must position the driver as far forwards as possible on the chassis. It should be possible to stand up in the vehicle, and the load area should be accessible from the driving seat, without exiting the vehicle. In addition to conventionally positioned doors at the back, the load area of the new van should have a door on the pavement side to facilitate loading and unloading. The decision had already been taken to base the new van on the running gear of the company's recently introduced front-engined front-wheel drive Citroën Traction, making it easier to meet Boulanger's brief because, without an under-floor drive shaft, the floor of the load space could be kept low.

The van
The Citroën product development department had the first prototype running by the Autumn of 1937, and on 12 May 1939 the van was homologated for sale in the French market. Although low floored vans with the driver set well forwards and sliding side-door on the pavement side would have become relatively mainstream 20 years later, in the 1930s the radical new van was quite unlike anything else available.

The van took its 4-cylinder  engine, initially of 1628 cc, from the company's Traction 7C. In the car the engine sat comfortably just behind the front wheels, but in the van most of the engine's weight, along with the driver's feet, was ahead of the front wheels. The driver's cab was raised sufficiently to allow most of the mechanical elements to be installed beneath it, although the engine itself intruded from the front into the central portion of the cab. The floor of the load area was just 42 cm (16 inches) above ground level, and it was possible for anyone less than 175 cm tall to stand in it without stooping. Access from the driver's seat to the load area behind was excellent, since on the right side of the driver's cab there was normally no second seat fitted. The side door on the pavement side was a sliding door, and in this respect another radical innovation. The sliding door on the right of the load area was fashioned from light-weight low cost materials. On each side of the load area, the upper side portions of the van's sides consisted tarpaulin-material curtains, incorporating small windows of flexible plastic. Again, the emphasis was on simplicity, saving weight and minimising cost. On the left-side, there being here no side door, the curtain ran the full length of the load area and could be rolled up and fixed to the roof edge, revealing a load space in excess of 6 cubic meters. The overall result was a structure which combined extreme practicality with extreme simplicity. The spare wheel and battery were stored in a locker on the left side of the van, accessible from the outside but completely sealed off from the load area. Production of the van's bodywork was entrusted to coach building firm Fernand Genève.

The engine was the 1,628 cc four-cylinder water-cooled unit which by now powered the 7C version of the manufacturer's Traction passenger car, which also provided the van's three-speed manual transmission and front torsion-bar suspension and front-wheel drive drive train. The van's rear suspension came from a simple leaf-spring arrangement. The  carrying capacity was a little greater than had initially been envisaged by Boulanger, which presumably led to a firming of the rear suspension settings. The light weight of the van's body, the lack of weight balance resulting from positioning the engine and driver at the extreme front of the vehicle and the rudimentary nature of the rear suspension meant that drivers quickly learned that without the weight of a load in the van, it was prone to tail slide. The hydraulic braking system also came from the Traction, though the drum brakes were the slightly larger ones from the 1911 cc Traction 11 version.

The 1628 cc TUB went on sale on 5 June 1939, less than four weeks after its homologation. It was priced at 36,000 francs at a time when the base versions of the  passenger cars from which it was derived were priced slightly above 26,000 francs.

The TUB replaced by the TUC
In September 1939 France declared war on Germany, and on 13 February 1940 a replacement version of the van appeared, described as the 11-T série U. The "11" in the van's name referred to its promotion to the 11CV taxation class which resulted from an increased engine size, now of 1,911 cc. Since the new vehicle was clearly an improved version of the Citroën TUB, respect for alphabetical logic ensured that it quickly became known as the Citroën TUC. The maximum load capacity was unchanged at  but there were numerous detailed improvements including the fitting of a second windscreen wiper to match the one on the driver's side of the screen. This may have been the point at which a small protruding ridge appeared beneath the front panel, apparently as a half-hearted acknowledgement that most motor vehicles of this size featured a front bumper. Despite the German invasion in May/June 1940, the TUB continued in production until the Spring of 1941, and the TUC replaced it on the production lines only in May 1941. By now raw materials for civilian product and fuel for civilian transport were rapidly disappearing. Few TUC vans were produced, and production of them ceased in December 1941.

About 100 models were transformed by Fenwick in 1941–1942 to be powered by an electric engine.

Commercial
Probably only about 1,740 of the vans were produced, most of them being the earlier 1628 cc TUB version which may appear a poor return for the effort that Citroën committed to the project. Nevertheless, when normal life began to return after the war Citroën were quick off the mark in 1946 with the Citroën H which was in many ways a slightly larger and less aggressively light-weight version of the TUB. The commercial success of the long-running H van owed much to its 1939 predecessor.

References

TUB
Vehicles introduced in 1939